Sinking Creek may refer to:

Sinking Creek (Breckinridge County, Kentucky), a tributary of the Ohio River
Sinking Creek (Jessamine County, Kentucky)
Sinking Creek (Current River), a stream in Missouri
Sinking Creek (Turnback Creek), a stream in Missouri
Sinking Creek (Pennsylvania), a tributary of Penns Creek
Sinking Creek (Clinch River), a river in Virginia
Sinking Creek (New River), a river in Virginia
Sinking Creek (Washington), a stream in Lincoln County